Gluttony (derived from the Latin gluttire meaning "to gulp down or swallow") means over-indulgence and over-consumption of food, drink, alcohol and other recreational drugs, or wealth items, particularly as status symbols. 

In Christianity, it is considered a sin if the excessive desire for food causes it to be withheld from the needy. Some Christian denominations consider gluttony one of the seven deadly sins.

Etymology 
In Deut 21:20 and Proverbs 23:21, it is זלל. The Gesenius Entry (lower left word) has indications of "squandering" and "profligacy" (waste).

In Matthew 11:19 and Luke 7:34, it is φαγος ("" transliterated character for character), The LSJ Entry is tiny, and only refers to one external source, Zenobius Paroemiographus 1.73. The word could mean merely "an eater", since φαγω means "eat"

In religion

Judaism 
Rambam, for example, prohibits excessive eating and drinking in Hilchot De'ot (e.g., halachot 1:4, 3:2, 5:1). The Chofetz Chaim (Yisrael Meir Kagan) prohibits gluttony on the basis of Leviticus 19:26, in Sefer Ha-Mitzvot Ha-Katzar (Prohibition #106).

Christianity 

Church leaders from the ascetic Middle Ages took a more expansive view of gluttony:

St. Gregory the Great 
Pope Gregory I (St. Gregory the Great), a doctor of the Church, described the following ways by which one can commit sin of gluttony, and corresponding biblical examples for each of them:

1. Eating before the time of meals in order to satisfy the palate.
Biblical example: Jonathan eating a little honey, when his father Saul commanded no food to be taken before the evening. (Note that this text is only approximately illustrative, as in this account, Jonathan did not know that Saul had forbidden eating.)
2. Seeking delicacies and better quality of food to gratify the "vile sense of taste."
Biblical example: When Israelites escaping from Egypt complained, "Who shall give us flesh to eat? We remember the fish which we did eat in Egypt freely; the cucumbers and the melons, and the leeks and the onions and the garlic," God rained fowls for them to eat but punished them 500 years later.
3. Seeking to stimulate the palate with overly or elaborately prepared food (e.g. with luxurious sauces and seasonings).
Biblical example: Two sons of Eli the high priest made the sacrificial meat to be cooked in one manner rather than another. They were met with death.
4. Exceeding the necessary quantity of food.
Biblical example: One of the sins of Sodom was "fullness of bread."
5. Taking food with too much eagerness, even when eating the proper amount, and even if the food is not luxurious.
Biblical example: Esau selling his birthright for ordinary food of bread and pottage of lentils. His punishment was that of the "profane person . . . who, for a morsel of meat sold his birthright," : we learn that "he found no place for repentance, though he sought it carefully, with tears." 

The fifth way is worse than all others, said St. Gregory, because it shows attachment to pleasure most clearly. To recapitulate, St Gregory the Great said that one may succumb to the sin of gluttony by: 1. Time (when); 2. Quality; 3. Stimulants; 4. Quantity; 5. Eagerness. He asserts that the irregular desire is the sin, not the food: "For it is not the food, but the desire that is in fault".

St. Thomas Aquinas 
In his Summa Theologica (Part 2-2, Question 148, Article 4), St. Thomas Aquinas reiterated the list of five ways to commit gluttony:

Laute – eating food that is too luxurious, exotic, or costly
Studiose – eating food that is excessive in quality (too daintily or elaborately prepared)
Nimis – eating food that is excessive in quantity (too much)
Praepropere – eating hastily (too soon or at an inappropriate time)
Ardenter – eating greedily (too eagerly)

St. Aquinas concludes that "gluttony denotes inordinate concupiscence in eating"; the first three ways are related to the food itself, while the last two related to the manner of eating. He says that abstinence from food and drink overcome the sin of gluttony, and the act of abstinence is fasting. (see: Fasting and abstinence in the Roman Catholic Church) In general, fasting is useful to restrain concupiscence of the flesh.

St. Alphonsus Liguori 
St. Alphonsus Liguori wrote the following when explaining gluttony:
"Pope Innocent XI has condemned the proposition which asserts that it is not a sin to eat or to drink from the sole motive of satisfying the palate. However, it is not a fault to feel pleasure in eating: for it is, generally speaking, impossible to eat without experiencing the delight which food naturally produces. But it is a defect to eat, like beasts, through the sole motive of sensual gratification, and without any reasonable object. Hence, the most delicious meats may be eaten without sin, if the motive be good and worthy of a rational creature; and, in taking the coarsest food through attachment to pleasure, there may be a fault."

Islam 

An interpretation of the meaning of a part of a Qur'anic verse is as follows:

“and eat and drink but waste not by extravagance, certainly He (Allah) likes not Al‑Musrifoon (those who waste by extravagance)”
[al-A’raaf 7:31]

The Sunnah encourages moderation in eating, and strongly criticizes extravagance.

The Prophet said: The son of Adam does not fill any vessel worse than his stomach. It is sufficient for the son of Adam to eat a few mouthfuls, to keep him going. If he must do that (fill his stomach), then let him fill one third with food, one third with drink and one third with air.” Narrated by al-Tirmidhi (2380); classed as saheeh (truthful) by al-Albaani in al-Silsilah al-Saheehah (2265).

In the Bible (King James Version) 

  – "And they shall say unto the elders of his city, This our son is stubborn and rebellious, he will not obey our voice; he is a glutton, and a drunkard.
  – "Be not among winebibbers; among riotous eaters of flesh: For the drunkard and the glutton shall come to poverty: and drowsiness shall clothe a man with rags."
  – "When thou sittest to eat with a ruler, consider diligently what is before thee.  And put a knife to thy throat, if thou be a man given to appetite."
  – "Hast thou found honey? eat so much as is sufficient for thee, lest thou be filled therewith, and vomit it."
  (and parallel account in ) – "For John the Baptist came neither eating bread nor drinking wine; and ye say, He hath a devil. The Son of man is come eating and drinking; and ye say, Behold a gluttonous man, and a winebibber, a friend of publicans and sinners! But wisdom is justified of all her children."

In arts 
Callimachus the famous Greek poet states, "All that I have given to my stomach has disappeared, and I have retained all the fodder that I gave to my spirit."

Popular quote "Eat to live, not live to eat" is commonly attributed to Socrates. A quotation from Rhetorica ad Herennium IV.28 : "Esse oportet ut vivas; non vivere ut edas" ("It is necessary to eat in order to live, not to live in order to eat") is credited by the Oxford Dictionary of Proverbs to Cicero.

See also

Food addiction
Binge eating
Mukbang

Further reading

References

Food and drink appreciation
Seven deadly sins
Obesity